Archips baolokia is a moth of the  family Tortricidae. It is found in Vietnam.

The wingspan is 17 mm. The ground colour of the forewings is brownish ferruginous, but paler in the tornal fourth of the wing with indistinct cream lines and brown suffusions and spots along the costa. The markings are almost completely atrophied and diffuse. The hindwings are pale brown.

Etymology
This name refers to the type locality in Vietnam, Bao Lok.

References

Archips
Moths described in 2009
Moths of Asia
Taxa named by Józef Razowski